The Brampton Times is a newspaper that was published in Brampton, Ontario, Canada until the early 1990s, when The Brampton Guardian’s free distribution eroded the Times subscription base.

Judi McLeod worked for the Times as a city-hall reporter; her 1983 firing by the paper was controversial. The Ontario Federation of Labour protested on McLeod's behalf against what they called political intervention.

References

Defunct newspapers published in Ontario
Mass media in Brampton
Publications with year of establishment missing
Publications with year of disestablishment missing